The Ouandjia-Vakaga Faunal Reserve is found in Central African Republic. It was established in 1925.This site is 7233 km2.

References

Protected areas of the Central African Republic
Faunal reserves